Black Bay River may refer to:
Black Bay River (Grenada)
Black Bay River (Saint Lucia)